= Second Regional Forum on the Prevention of Genocide =

The Second Regional Forum on the Prevention of Genocide took place in Arusha, Tanzania, on March 3–5, 2010. The Regional Fora on the Prevention of Genocide are co-organized by the Ministry of Foreign Affairs and International Cooperation of the United Republic of Tanzania, the Swiss Federal Department of Foreign Affairs (FDFA) and the Ministry of Foreign Affairs, International Commerce and Religion of the Nation of Argentina. The First Regional Forum took place in December 2008 in Argentina, and the next forum was scheduled to be held in Asia in 2011.

== The Forum's Panel Discussions ==
1. What is genocide and how to prevent it;
2. Preventing genocide: Role and responsibilities of state and international actors and ways forward;
3. Prevention of genocide: Role and responsibilities of non-state actors and ways forward;
4. Africa: Experiences and visions for the future;
5. Asia, Latin America and Europe: Experiences, lessons learned and ways forward.
